Ad-din Foundation is non-profit foundation that provides social and healthcare services to the poor.

History
The organization was set up in 1980 in Jessore District by Sheikh Akijuddin and Mohammad Sharif Husain. The charity runs a hospital, women's medical college, orphanages, and social programs like HIV awareness. The hospitals are located in Moghbazar, Dhaka and Munshiganj.

References

1980 establishments in Bangladesh
Medical and health organisations based in Bangladesh